Sex change is a natural or artificial process in which an individual's sex is changed.

Sex change may also refer to:

Biology and medicine
Sequential hermaphroditism, a phenomenon whereby some animals naturally change sex
Sex reassignment therapy, the medical aspect of gender transition, that is, modifying one's sex characteristics
Gender-affirming surgery, surgical procedures that alters a transgender person's physical appearance and sexual characteristics

Other uses
 Sex Change (album), a 2007 album by Trans Am
 Change of Sex or Sex Change, a 1976 Spanish film
 Sex Change Hospital, an American documentary-style reality television series about 12 transgender people who have sex reassignment surgery in Colorado
 A Change of Sex, 1979 television documentary about English trans woman Julia Grant
 Elvis Sex-Change, 1993 compilation album by the British indie rock band Cornershop
 Root Boy Slim and the Sex Change Band, American blues rock band